Bangert is a neighbourhood of Andijk and former village in northwest Netherlands, located in Medemblik, North Holland.

Throughout its history Bangert has been competing with surrounding municipalities (esp. Andijk and Kerkbuurt) for land and population. For instance, in 1667 neighbouring Kerkbuurt acquired a church and began pulling away some of Bangert's inhabitants. In the 19th and 20th centuries, poverty combined with landgrabbing by Wervershoof also diminished the village.

In 2011, it became part of the Medemblik municipality.

References 

Medemblik
Populated places in North Holland